The Igreja de Castro de Avelãs is a National monument of Portugal. It is located in Bragança Municipality, in the parish of Castro de Avelãs.

References

Roman Catholic churches in Bragança, Portugal
National monuments in Bragança District
Churches in Bragança District